Alexander Jardine (12 April 1926 – 6 June 1978) was a Scottish footballer, who played as a full back.

Career
Jardine began his career in the mid-1940s with Dundee United, spending four years at Tannadice before moving to Millwall in 1950 for £700. He was selected to play for the Third Division South representative side in 1954/55, 1955/56 and 1956/57 (both games). Jardine spent eight years with Millwall before retiring in 1958 due to an Achilles tendon injury.

Jardine died in 1978.

References

External links
 

1926 births
Footballers from Motherwell
1978 deaths
Scottish footballers
Scottish Football League players
Dundee United F.C. players
English Football League players
Millwall F.C. players
Association football fullbacks